Alfio Vandi (born 7 December 1955) is an Italian former professional racing cyclist of the 1970s and 1980s. The highlight of his career was winning the Young rider Classification in the 1976 Giro d'Italia. He placed seventh overall in that Giro. His highest placing in the Giro was fourth in the 1977 Giro d'Italia.

References

External links

1955 births
Living people
Italian male cyclists
Sportspeople from the Province of Rimini
Cyclists from Emilia-Romagna